In Greek mythology, Melaneus (Ancient Greek: Μελανεύς) was the founder of Oechalia (Oikhalia), variously located in Thessaly, Messenia or Euboea and also king of the Dryopes.

Biography 
Melaneus was a noted archer, inheriting Apollo's archery skills. Apollo, his father, carried away his bride to be Stratonice from her father's home to marry his son, Melaneus. This Stratonice was a Calydonian princess as the daughter of King Porthaon by his wife Laothoe. By her, Melaneus became the father of Eurytus, the famous archer whose reputation overshadowed his father, and of Ambracia, eponym of Ambracia in Epirus. Alternatively, Melaneus was the husband of Oechalia (merely the eponym of the kingdom he was assigned to by Perieres).

Mythology

Antoninus' account 
In Antoninus Liberalis, Metamorphoses recounts the dispute between Apollo, Artemis and Heracles about the patronage of the city of Ambracia. Here Apollo raise his claim by stating that his descendants established the city of Ambracia:This Cragaleus was at this time already an old man and was considered by his countrymen to be just and wise. While he was pasturing his cattle, Apollo, Artemis and Heracles introduced themselves to him since they wanted a decision about Ambracia in Epirus. Apollo said that the city belonged to him because Melaneus– his son– had become king of the Dryopes having taken in war the whole of Epirus. Melaneus had as sons Eurytus and Ambracias, after whom the city of Ambracia is named. Apollo himself had shown great favour to this city.

Pausanias' account 
In Pausanias, Description of Greece also told a story about Melaneus and his arrival to Messenia:Some time later, as no descendant of Polycaon survived (in my opinion his house lasted for five generations, but no more), they summoned Perieres, the son of Aeolus, as king. To him, the Messenians say, came Melaneus, a good archer and considered for this reason to be a son of Apollo; Perieres assigned to him as a dwelling a part of the country now called the Carnasium, but which then received the name Oechalia, derived, as they say, from the wife of Melaneus.

Notes

References 

 Antoninus Liberalis, The Metamorphoses of Antoninus Liberalis translated by Francis Celoria (Routledge 1992). Online version at the Topos Text Project.
 Hesiod, Catalogue of Women from Homeric Hymns, Epic Cycle, Homerica translated by Evelyn-White, H G. Loeb Classical Library Volume 57. London: William Heinemann, 1914. Online version at theio.com
 March, J., Cassell's Dictionary of Classical Mythology, London, 1999. 
 .
 Pausanias, Description of Greece with an English Translation by W.H.S. Jones, Litt.D., and H.A. Ormerod, M.A., in 4 Volumes. Cambridge, MA, Harvard University Press; London, William Heinemann Ltd. 1918. Online version at the Perseus Digital Library
 Pausanias, Graeciae Descriptio. 3 vols. Leipzig, Teubner. 1903.  Greek text available at the Perseus Digital Library.

Kings in Greek mythology
Children of Apollo

Demigods in classical mythology